Trial by Fire is a five-issue mini-series published in 2003 by CrossGen. The story was plotted by R. A. Salvatore and Scott Ciencin, scripted by Scott Ciencin, with art by Ron Wagner and colors by Caesar Rodriguez.

It is based on Salvatore's The DemonWars Saga and focuses on the elven trained barbarian ranger Andacanavar.

Plot
In Trial by Fire, a young Andacanavar embarks on one of his earliest adventures. With his Elven-forged blade and improbable allies, the ranger fights to save a world of magic from the ravages of a DemonWar.

Collected editions
The series has been collected into a trade paperback:
Demon Wars: Trial by Fire (160 pages, CrossGen, May 2003)

References

External links
Rasalvatore.com - Demon Wars

Comics based on fiction
Novels by R. A. Salvatore